"Looking for the Summer" is a song by British singer-songwriter Chris Rea, released in 1991 as the third single from his eleventh studio album Auberge. It was written by Rea and produced by Jon Kelly. "Looking for the Summer" reached No. 49 in the UK and remained in the charts for three weeks. A music video was filmed to promote the single. It also featured in a diner scene in the 1992 Hollywood blockbuster Basic Instinct.

Background
In a 1991 interview with Dennis Elsas, Rea described the song's lyrical message: "The idea is fundamentally a guy is looking at his daughter, who is now just about in her teenage years and he sees her turn away. She's looking to her summer, she's spring looking for the summer, and he, then in autumn, looks back and remembers what it was like when he also looked for his summer. The third verse reminds his wife how they hurt each other's growing pains, while they both looked for their summers, and in many ways he still looks for his summer."

Critical reception
In a review of Auberge, Deborah Hornblow of The Hartford Courant considered the song as one of the album's "better tracks", and noted the song is "infused with a wide-openness and yearning by the strains of Rea's fine guitar work". Adam Sweeting of The Guardian commented: "Song titles like "Looking for the Summer" are accurate guides to their contents."

Johnny Loftus of AllMusic recommended the song by labelling it an AMG Pick Track. In a 2017 concert review, Andrew Steel of Yorkshire Evening Post described the song as a "classic" and added: "The soft-rock gems of "Julia" and "Looking for the Summer" are smart, lithe numbers possessed of a foot-tapping joy underneath his husky vocals, rugged and languorous."

Track listing
7" single
 "Looking for the Summer" (Remix) – 3:51
 "Six Up" – 4:06

12" single
 "Looking for the Summer" (Remix) – 3:51
 "Six Up" – 4:06
 "Urban Samurai" – 4:27

Cassette single
 "Looking for the Summer" (Remix) – 3:51
 "Six Up" – 4:06

CD single
 "Looking for the Summer" (Remix) – 3:54
 "Six Up" – 4:08
 "Theme From the Pantile Journals" – 4:13
 "Teach Me to Dance" – 4:05

CD single (US promo)
 "Looking for the Summer" (Edit) – 3:50
 "Looking for the Summer" (LP Version) – 5:04

Personnel
 Chris Rea - guitar, slide guitar, Hammond organ
 Anthony Drennan - nylon guitar, acoustic guitar
 Max Middleton - Rhodes
 Robert Ahwai - bass
 Martin Ditcham - drums, percussion

Production
 Jon Kelly - producer
 Chris Rea, Dave Richards - producers of "Urban Samurai"
 Justin Shirley-Smith - engineer
 Russell Shaw - assistant engineer

Other
 Lewis Edwards - sleeve painting

Charts

References

1991 songs
1991 singles
East West Records singles
Atco Records singles
Songs written by Chris Rea
Chris Rea songs